Jolán Humenyánszky (17 February 1942 – 6 February 2021) was a Hungarian sculptor.

Biography
Humenyánszky was born in Ózd. Between 1961 and 1966 she studied at the Hungarian University of Fine Arts, where her teachers were Szabó Iván and Mikus Sándor. Her works are mainly realistic portraits and small sculptures. She was diagnosed with lung cancer in autumn 2020 and died in February 2021, aged 78.

She had a son. Her husband, István Szilágyi, was an actor until his death in 2020. She died eleven days short of her 79th birthday.

Awards 
1971: Nívódíj.

Solo exhibitions 
 1984, 1992 • Budapest, XVII. District House of Culture, Budapest

Works 
 Ady Endre (bust, 1970, Ózd)
 Semmelweis (bust, 1971, Kiskunhalas)
 Juhász Gyula (stone bust, 1980, Makó)
 Lantos nő (1980, Bácsalmás)
 Balásházy János (memorial plaque, 1983, Budapest, FM arcade)
 Cserháti Sándor (bronze bust, 1989, Budapest, FM arcade)
 Anker Alfonz (bronze bust, 1984, Kaposvár)
 Volni József (bronze plaque, 1989, Borsodnádasd)
 Macskássy Árpád (bronze memorial plaque, 1994, Budapest XI. District)

References

External links 
 Artportal

1942 births
2021 deaths
Hungarian women sculptors
People from Ózd
20th-century Hungarian sculptors
20th-century Hungarian women artists
21st-century Hungarian sculptors
21st-century Hungarian women artists
Hungarian University of Fine Arts alumni